The Caliphate of Córdoba (transliterated Khilāfat Qurṭuba), also known as the Cordoban Caliphate was an Islamic state ruled by the Umayyad dynasty from 929 to 1031. Its territory comprised Iberia and parts of North Africa, with its capital in Córdoba. It succeeded the Emirate of Córdoba upon the self-proclamation of Umayyad emir Abd ar-Rahman III as caliph in January 929. The period was characterized by an expansion of trade and culture, and saw the construction of masterpieces of al-Andalus architecture.

The caliphate disintegrated in the early 11th century during the Fitna of al-Andalus, a civil war between the descendants of caliph Hisham II and the successors of his hajib (court official), Al-Mansur. In 1031, after years of infighting, the caliphate fractured into a number of independent Muslim taifa (kingdoms).

History

Umayyad Dynasty

Rise
Abd ar-Rahman I became emir of Córdoba in 756 after six years in exile after the Umayyads lost the position of caliph in Damascus to the Abbasids in 750. Intent on regaining power, he defeated the area's existing Islamic rulers and united various local fiefdoms into an emirate. Raids then increased the emirate's size; the first to go as far as Corsica occurred in 806.

The emirate's rulers used the title "emir" or "sultan" until the 10th century. In the early 10th century, Abd ar-Rahman III faced a threatened invasion from North Africa by the Fatimid Caliphate, a rival Shiite Islamic empire based in Ifriqiya. Since the Fatimids also claimed the caliphate, in response Abd ar-Rahman III claimed the title of caliph himself. Prior to Abd ar-Rahman's proclamation as the caliph, the Umayyads generally recognized the Abbasid caliph of Baghdad as being the rightful rulers of the Muslim community. Even after repulsing the Fatimids, he kept the more prestigious title. Although his position as caliph was not accepted outside of al-Andalus and its North African affiliates, internally the Spanish Umayyads considered themselves as closer to Muhammad, and thus more legitimate, than the Abbasids.

Prosperity

The caliphate enjoyed increased prosperity during the 10th century. Abd ar-Rahman III united al-Andalus and brought the Christian kingdoms of the north under control by force and through diplomacy. Abd ar-Rahman III stopped the Fatimid advance into Morocco and al-Andalus in order to prevent a future invasion. The plan for a Fatimid invasion was thwarted when Abd ar-Rahman III secured Melilla in 927, Ceuta in 931, and Tangier in 951. In 948, the Idrisid emir Abul-Aish Ahmad recognised the caliphate, although he refused to allow them to occupy Tangier. The Umayyads besieged Tangier in 949 and defeated Abul-Aish, forcing him to retreat. The Umayyads then occupied the rest of northern Morocco. Although another Fatimid invasion of Morocco occurred in 958 under their general, Jawhar. Al-Hassan II had to recognise the Fatimids. The Umayyads responded by invading Idrisid Morocco in 973 with their general, Ghalib. By 974, Al-Hassan II was taken to Cordoba, and the remaining Idrisids recognised Umayyad rule. This period of prosperity was marked by increasing diplomatic relations with Berber tribes in North Africa, Christian kings from the north, and with France, Germany and Constantinople. The caliphate became very profitable during the reign of Abd ar-Rahman III, by increasing the public revenue to 6,245,000 dinars from Abd ar-Rahman II. The profits made during this time were divided into three parts: the payment of the salaries and maintenance of the army, the preservation of public buildings, and the needs of the caliph. The death of Abd ar-Rahman III led to the rise of his 46-year-old son, Al-Hakam II, in 961. Al-Hakam II continued his father's policy toward Christian kings and North African rebels. Al-Hakam's reliance on his advisers was greater than his father's because the previous prosperity under Abd ar-Rahman III allowed al-Hakam II to let the caliphate run by itself. This style of rulership suited al-Hakam II since he was more interested in his scholarly and intellectual pursuits than ruling the caliphate. The caliphate was at its intellectual and scholarly peak under al-Hakam II.

Fall

The death of al-Hakam II in 976 marked the beginning of the end of the caliphate. Before his death, al-Hakam named his only son Hisham II successor. Although the 10-year-old child was ill-equipped to be caliph, Al-Mansur Ibn Abi Aamir (top adviser to al-Hakam, also known as Almanzor), who had sworn an oath of obedience to Hisham II, pronounced him caliph. In 996, Almanzor sent an invasion force to Morocco. After three months of struggle, his forces retreated to Tangier. Almanzor then sent a powerful reinforcement under his son Abd al-Malik. The armies clashed near Tangier. The Umayyads would enter Fes on 13 October 998 once the gates of the city were opened. Almanzor had great influence over Subh, the mother and regent of Hisham II. Almanzor, along with Subh, isolated Hisham in Córdoba while systematically eradicating opposition to his own rule, allowing Berbers from Africa to migrate to al-Andalus to increase his base of support. While Hisham II was caliph, he was merely a figurehead. The power nominally held by Caliph Hisham was retained by Almanzor's sons, Abd al-Malik al-Muzaffar, who died in 1008, and Abd al-Rahman Sanchuelo. However, while Abd al-Rahman was leading a raid on the Christian north, a revolt tore through Córdoba and deposed him, and he was killed when he tried to restore himself to power.

The title of caliph became symbolic, without power or influence. The death of Abd al-Rahman Sanchuelo in 1009 marked the beginning of the Fitna of al-Andalus, with rivals claiming to be the new caliph, violence sweeping the caliphate, and intermittent invasions by the Hammudid dynasty.  Beset by factionalism, the caliphate crumbled in 1031 into a number of independent taifas, including the Taifa of Córdoba, Taifa of Seville and Taifa of Zaragoza. The last Córdoban Caliph was Hisham III (1027–1031).

Reform of army and administration
The separation between the temporal power, held by Almanzor, and the spiritual, in the hands of Hisham as Caliph, increased the importance of military force, a symbol – along with the new majesty of the chamberlain's court, rival of that of the caliph himself – of the power of Almanzor, and an instrument to guarantee the payment of taxes.

Almanzor successfully continued the military reforms begun by Al-Hakam and his predecessors, covering many aspects. On one hand, he increased the professionalization of the regular army, necessary both to guarantee his military power in the capital and to ensure the availability of forces for his numerous campaigns, one of the sources of his political legitimacy. This policy de-emphasized levies and other non-professional troops, which he replaced with taxes used to support the professional troops—often saqalibas  or Maghrebis—which freed the natives of al-Andalus from military service. Recruitment of saqalibas and Berbers was not new, but Almanzor expanded it. On the other hand, he created new units, unlike the regular army of the Caliphate, that were faithful primarily to himself and served to control the capital.  Emir Abd al-Rahman I had already used Berbers and saqalibas for a permanent army of forty thousand to end the conflicts that hitherto had plagued the emirate.  At the time of Emir Muhammad I, the army reached thirty-five to forty thousand combatants, half of them Syrian military contingents. This massive hiring of mercenaries and slaves meant that, according to Christian chroniclers, "ordinarily the Saracen armies amount to 30, 40, 50, or 60,000 men, even when in serious occasions they reach 100, 160, 300 and even 600,000 fighters."  In fact, it has been argued that, in Almanzor's time, the Cordovan armies could muster six hundred thousand laborers and two hundred thousand horses "drawn from all provinces of the empire."

In order to eliminate a possible threat to his power and to improve military efficiency, Almanzor abolished the system of tribal units that had been in decline due to lack of Arabs and institution of pseudo-feudalism on the frontiers, in which the different tribes each had their own commander and that had caused continuous clashes, and replaced it with mixed units without clear loyalty under orders from Administration officials. The nucleus of the new army, however, was formed increasingly by Maghrebi Berber forces. The ethnic rivalries among Arabs, Berbers and Slavs within the Andalusian army were skillfully used by Almanzor to maintain his own power—for example, by ordering that every unit of the army consist of diverse ethnic groups so that they would not unite against him; and thus preventing the emergence of possible rivals. However, once their centralizing figure disappeared, these units were one of the main causes of the 11th-century civil war called the Fitna of al-Andalus. Berber forces were also joined by contingents of well-paid Christian mercenaries, who formed the bulk of Almanzor's personal guard and participated in his campaigns in Christian territories. Almanzor's completion of this reform, begun by his predecessors, fundamentally divided the population into two unequal groups: a large mass of civilian taxpayers and a small professional military caste, generally from outside the peninsula.

The increase in military forces and their partial professionalization led to an increase in financial expenses to sustain them. This represented an additional incentive to carry out campaigns, which produced loot and land with which to pay the troops. These lands, when handed over to the soldiers as payment, were thereafter subject to tribute and ceased to operate under a system of border colonization. The Caliphal army was funded by the taxpaying farmers in exchange for military exemptions, and consisted of local recruits as well as foreign mercenaries – Berber militias, Slav and Black slaves, mercenary Christian companies and jihadi volunteers. At that time al-Andalus was known as Dar Jihad, or "country of jihad", and attracted many volunteers, and though these were relatively few compared to the total army, their zeal in combat more than compensated for this.

According to modern studies, these mercenary contingents made it possible to increase the total size of the Caliphal army from thirty or fifty thousand troops in the time of Abd al-Rahman III to fifty or ninety thousand. Others, like Évariste Lévi-Provençal, argue that the Cordoban armies in the field with the Almanzor were between thirty-five thousand and seventy or seventy-five thousand soldiers. Contemporary figures are contradictory: some accounts claim that their armies numbered two hundred thousand horsemen and six hundred thousand foot soldiers, while others talk about twelve thousand horsemen, three thousand mounted Berbers and two thousand sūdān, African light infantry. According to the chronicles, in the campaign that swept Astorga and León, Almanzor led twelve thousand African and five thousand Al Andalus horsemen, and forty thousand infantry. It is also said that, in his last campaigns, he mobilized forty-six thousand horsemen, while another six hundred guarded the train, twenty-six thousand infantry, two hundred scouts or 'police' and one hundred and thirty drummers. or that the garrison of Cordoba consisted of 10,500 horsemen and many others kept the northern border in dispersed detachments. However, it is much more likely that the leader's armies, even in their most ambitious campaigns, may not have exceeded twenty thousand men. It can be argued that until the eleventh century no Muslim army on campaign exceeded thirty thousand troops, while during the eighth century the trans-Pyrenean expeditions totaled ten thousand men and those carried out against Christians in the north of the peninsula were even smaller.

In the time of Emir Al-Hakam I, a palatine guard of 3000 riders and 2000 infantry was created, all Slavic slaves. This proportion between the two types of troops was maintained until Almanzor's reforms.  The massive incorporation of North African horsemen relegated the infantry to sieges and fortress garrisons. This reform led to entire tribes, particularly Berber riders, being moved to the peninsula.

The main weapon of the peninsular campaigns, which required speed and surprise, was the light cavalry. To try to counteract them, the Castilians created the role of "villain knights" – ennobling those free men who were willing to keep a horse to increase the mounted units – through the Fuero de Castrojeriz of 974. For similar reasons, the Barcelonan count Borrell II created the figure of the homes of paratge- who obtained privileged military status by fighting against the Cordobans armed on horseback – after losing their capital in the fall of 985. In contrast to the prominent role the navy had played in previous decades under Abd al-Rahman III, under Almanzor it served only as a means of transporting ground troops, such as between the Maghreb and the Iberian Peninsula, or Alcácer do Sal's ships in the campaign against Santiago de Compostela in 997.

During this time, military industry flourished in factories around Córdoba. It was said to be able to produce a thousand bows and twenty thousand arrows monthly, and 1300 shields and three thousand campaign stores annually.

As for the fleet, its network of ports was reinforced with a new base in the Atlantic, in Alcácer do Sal, which protected the area of Coimbra, recovered in the 980s, and served as the origin of the units that participated in the campaign against Santiago. On the Mediterranean shore, the naval defense was centered at the base of al-Mariya, now Almería.  The dockyards of the fleet had been built in Tortosa in 944.

Initially the maritime defense of the Caliphate was led by Abd al-Rahman ibn Muhammad ibn Rumahis, a veteran admiral who had served Al-Hakam II and was Qadi of Elvira and Pechina. He repulsed raids by al-Magus (idolaters) or al-Urdumaniyun ('men of the north', vikings), in the west of al-Andalus in mid-971; at the end of that year, when they tried to invade Al Andalus, the admiral left Almería and defeated them off the coast of Algarve. In April 973, he transported the army of Ghalib from Algeciras to subdue the rebellious tribes of the Maghreb and end Fatimid ambitions in that area. As in 997, when the Al Andalus fleet hit the Galician coast, in 985 it had ravaged the Catalans. During the Catalan campaign, Gausfred I, Count of Empurias and Roussillon, tried to gather an army to help the locals but then several flotillas of Berber pirates threatened their coasts, forcing them to stay to defend their lands.

To ensure control of the military, Almanzor eliminated the main figures who could have opposed his reforms: in addition to the death of Ghalib, the participation of the governor of Zaragoza in the plot of his eldest son served as a justification to replace him with another, more amenable, member of the same clan, the Banu Tujib. The admiral of the fleet, who maintained a significant budget, was poisoned in January 980 and replaced by a man faithful to Almanzor.

As in the Army he encouraged the recruitment of Berbers faithful to him, so in the Administration he favored the saqalibas to the detriment of native officials, again with the aim of surrounding himself with personnel loyal only to him.

Land transport routes were dotted with strongholds, since ancient Al Andalus dignitaries sought to control communications. Messengers were bought in Sudan and specially trained to handle Almanzor's messages and to transmit the official reports that his foreign ministries wrote about the annual campaigns.

The Caliphate ruled by Almanzor was a rich and powerful state. According to Colmeiro, it is estimated that in a pre-industrial society, for every million inhabitants, ten thousand soldiers could be mustered. Even assuming the chronicles exaggerated tenfold the real numbers – these speak of eight hundred thousand soldiers – the caliphate could have had eight million inhabitants. Those who use more bullish criteria estimate between seven and ten million, but the population was probably much fewer. Traditionally speaking, around the year 1000, the caliphate occupied four hundred thousand square kilometers and was populated by three million souls. By comparison, the Iberian Christian states comprised one hundred and sixty thousand square kilometers and half a million people. By the 10th century, 75% of the population under the Umayyads had converted to Islam, a number reaching 80% two centuries later. By comparison, at the time of the Muslim invasion, Spain had about four million inhabitants, although there is no shortage of historians who would raise that estimate to seven or eight million.

His realm also had large cities like Córdoba, which surpassed one hundred thousand inhabitants; Toledo, Almería and Granada, which were around thirty thousand; and Zaragoza, Valencia and Málaga, all above fifteen thousand. This contrasted sharply with the Christian north of the peninsula, which lacked large urban centers.

Culture

Literature and scholarship 
Córdoba was the cultural and intellectual centre of al-Andalus, with translations of ancient Greek texts into Arabic, Latin and Hebrew. During the reign of al-Hakam II, the royal library possessed an estimated 400,000 to 500,000 volumes. For comparison, the Abbey of Saint Gall in Switzerland contained just over 100 volumes. Advances in science, history, geography, philosophy, and language occurred during the Caliphate. Al-Andalus's prosperity and the caliph's patronage attracted travelers, diplomats and scholars. They continued the legacy of figures such as Ziryab in the 9th century by bringing in new styles of art, music, and literature from the eastern Islamic world. Cordoba also became a center of culture and high society in its own right. Poets sought the patronage of its court, as with the example of Ibn Darraj al-Qastali, who served as court poet for Abd al-Rahman III, Al-Hakam II, and Almanzor. Other poets, such as Yusuf al-Ramadi, composed works on nature and love. Muwashshah, a form of Andalusi vernacular poetry combining vernacular Arabic and the vernacular Romance language, grew more popular during this period. Writers also began to compose histories devoted to the Umayyad dynasty of Al-Andalus, such as Ahmad al-Razi's History of the Rulers of al-Andalus. These histories also provided information on the land and its people. Many ideas and myths concerning the history of al-Andalus – including stories about its initial Muslim conquest in the 8th century – began to appear in this period.

Christians and Jews contributed to the intellectual and cultural spheres of al-Andalus, although this required that they publicly respect the higher status of the Arabic language and of the Islamic religion. Hasdai ibn Shaprut was one of the most well-known Jewish figures of this time. In addition to serving in the caliph's court and being highly versed in Arabic culture, Hasdai was also a patron of Hebrew scholarship. He was determined to establish the Jewish community of al-Andalus as independent from the Jewish academies of Baghdad and the Middle East, which helped bring about the Golden Age of Jewish culture in the region. By contrast, Latin culture within Al-Andalus declined as local Christians became increasingly Arabized. The Latin language was retained in liturgy. However, Andalusi Christians did journey to and from the Christian-controlled territories to the north and in the rest of Europe, contributing to the transmission of knowledge from al-Andalus to the rest of Europe.

Some upper-class women also had the resources to receive education and participate in high culture in the domains of poetry and even religion. Examples include 'Aisha ibn Ahmad, who was born from a noble family and wrote poetry, copied the Qur'an, and founded libraries. Lubna, a slave in the service of al-Hakam II, served as one of the caliph's scribes (or secretaries) and a librarian. Although religious domains were still dominated by men, Fatima bint Yahya al-Maghami was a well-known faqih (expert on Islamic law and jurisprudence) who taught both men and women.

Arts 
The caliph's official workshops, such as those at Madinat al-Zahra, fabricated luxury products for use at court or as gifts for guests, allies, and diplomats, which stimulated artistic production. Many objects produced in the caliph's workshops later made their way into the collections of museums and Christian cathedrals in Europe. Among the most famous objects of this period are ivory boxes which are carved with vegetal, figurative, and epigraphic motifs. Notable surviving examples include the Pyxis of al-Mughira, the Pyxis of Zamora, and the Leyre Casket. The caliphal workshops also produced fine silks, including tiraz textiles, ceramics, and leatherwork. Metalwork objects were also produced, of which the most famous surviving piece is the so-called "Cordoba Stag", a bronze fountain spout carved in the form of a stag which was made at Madinat al-Zahra and preserved by the Archeological Museum of Cordoba. Two other bronze examples of similar craftsmanship, shaped like deers, are kept at the National Archeological Museum in Madrid and the Islamic Art Museum in Doha. While the production of ivory and silk objects largely stopped after the Caliphate's collapse, production in other mediums like leather and ceramic continued in later periods.

Marble was also carved for decorative elements in some buildings, such as wall paneling and window grilles. One of the most prolific types of marble craftsmanship were capitals, which continued the general configuration of Roman Corinthian capitals but were deeply carved with Islamic vegetal motifs (known as ataurique in Spanish) in a distinctive style associated with the caliphal period. These capitals later became prized spolia and can be found in later buildings across the region built under the Almoravids and Almohads. Another notable example is a marble basin, now kept at the Dar Si Said Museum in Marrakesh, which was crafted at Madinat al-Zahra between 1002 and 1007 to serve as an ablutions basin and dedicated to 'Abd al-Malik, the son of al-Mansur, before being shipped to Morocco and re-used in new buildings.

Architecture 

Abd ar-Rahman III marked his political ascendancy with the creation of a vast and lavish palace-city called Madinat al-Zahra (also spelled and pronounced today as "Medina Azahara"), located just outside Cordoba. Construction began in 936–940 and continued in multiple phases throughout his reign and the reign of his son son, Al-Hakam II (r. 961–976). The new city included ceremonial reception halls, a congregational mosque, administrative and government offices, aristocratic residences, gardens, a mint, workshops, barracks, service quarters, and baths.

He also expanded the courtyard (sahn) of Cordoba's Great Mosque and built its first true minaret (a tower from which the call to prayer was issued). The minaret, with a square floor plan, set another precedent that was followed in the architecture of other mosques in the region. Abd ar Rahman III's cultured successor, al-Hakam II, further expanded the mosque's prayer hall, starting in 962. He endowed it with some of its most significant architectural flourishes and innovations, which included interlacing multifoil arches, decorative ribbed domes, and a richly-ornamented mihrab (niche symbolizing the direction of prayer) with Byzantine-influenced gold mosaics.

A much smaller but historically notable work from the late caliphate period is the Bab al-Mardum Mosque (later known as the Church of San Cristo de la Luz) in Toledo, which features a variety of ribbed domes resting on horseshoe arches and an exterior façade with Arabic inscriptions carved in brick. Other monuments from the Caliphate period in al-Andalus include several of Toledo's old city gates, the former mosque (and later monastery) of Almonaster la Real, the Castle of Tarifa, the Castle of Baños de la Encina (near Seville), the Caliphal Baths of Cordoba, and, possibly, the Baths of Jaen.

In the 10th century much of northern Morocco also came directly within the sphere of influence of the Cordoban Caliphate, with competition from the Fatimid Caliphate further east. Early contributions to Moroccan architecture from this period include expansions to the Qarawiyyin and Andalusiyyin mosques in Fes and the addition of their square-shafted minarets, carried out under the sponsorship of Abd ar-Rahman III and following the example of the minaret he built for the Great Mosque of Cordoba.

Economy

The economy of the caliphate was diverse and successful, with trade predominating. Muslim trade routes connected al-Andalus with the outside world via the Mediterranean. Industries revitalized during the caliphate included textiles, ceramics, glassware, metalwork, and agriculture. The Arabs introduced crops such as rice, watermelon, banana, eggplant and hard wheat. Fields were irrigated with water wheels. Some of the most prominent merchants of the caliphate were Jews. Jewish merchants had extensive networks of trade that stretched the length of the Mediterranean Sea. Since there was no international banking system at the time, payments relied on a high level of trust, and this level of trust could only be cemented through personal or family bonds, such as marriage. Jews from al-Andalus, Cairo, and the Levant all intermarried across borders. Therefore, Jewish merchants in the caliphate had counterparts abroad that were willing to do business with them. The Cordoban economy was also exceptionally active in part due to its robust system of coinage, which was maintained and improved upon form the Abbasid rule. 

Cordoba was one of the major centers in the mediterranean slave trade. This was in part due to its geographical location and in part to its own reliance on the practice. Geographically, Cordoba is in the southern central region of Spain, with access to the sea via the Guadalquivir river. It used this location to its advantage as its main suppliers of Christian slaves were the Northern European lands and the buyers of these same slaves were in the Muslim lands, regions with which it had already had trade connections. The slave trade in Cordoba also thrived because of the administration's reliance on slaves. These slaves were owned by the caliph and held important positions within the household and the military. Slaves in particular made up a significant portion of the caliphate's army.

Religion
The caliphate had an ethnically, culturally, and religiously diverse society. A minority of ethnic Muslims of Arab descent occupied the priestly and ruling positions, another Muslim minority were primarily soldiers and muladi converts were found throughout society. Jews comprised about ten percent of the population: little more numerous than the Arabs and about equal in numbers to the Berbers. They were primarily involved in business and intellectual occupations. The Christian minority (Mozarabs) professed by and large the Visigothic rite. The Mozarabs were in a lower strata of society, heavily taxed with few civil rights and culturally influenced by the Muslims. Ethnic Arabs occupied the top of the social hierarchy; Muslims had a higher social standing than Jews, who had a higher social standing than Christians. Christians and Jews were considered dhimmis, required to pay jizya (a protection tax).

Half of the population in Córdoba is reported to have been Muslim by the 10th century, with an increase to 70 percent by the 11th century. That was due less to local conversion than to Muslim immigration from the rest of the Iberian Peninsula and North Africa. Christians saw their status decline from their rule under the Visigoths, meanwhile the status of Jews improved during the Caliphate.  While Jews were persecuted under the Visigoths, Jewish communities benefited from Umayyad rule by obtaining more freedom, affluence and a higher social standing.

Population
According to Thomas Glick, "Despite the withdrawal of substantial numbers during the drought and famine of the 750s, fresh Berber migration from North Africa was a constant feature of Andalusi history, increasing in tempo in the tenth century. Hispano-Romans who converted to Islam, numbering six or seven millions, comprised the majority of the population and also occupied the lowest rungs on the social ladder."  It is also estimated that the capital city held around 450,000 people, making it the second largest city in Europe at the time.

List of caliphs

See also
 History of Islam
 History of Gibraltar
 History of Algeria
 History of Portugal
 History of Morocco
 History of Spain
 List of Sunni Muslim dynasties
 Martyrs of Córdoba
 Timeline of Septimania
 Umayyad conquest of Hispania

Notes and references

Bibliography

Further reading
 Ambrosio, B.; Hernandez, C.; Noveletto, A.; Dugoujon, J. M.; Rodriguez, J. N.; Cuesta, P.; Fortes-Lima, C.; Caderon, R. (2010). "Searching the peopling of the Iberian Peninsula from the perspective of two Andalusian subpopulations: a study based on Y-chromosome haplogroups J and E". Collegium Antropologicum 34 (4): 1215–1228.
 
 Guichard, P. (1976). Al-Andalus: Estructura antropológica de una sociedad islámica en Occidente. Barcelona: Barral Editores. 

 
929 establishments
Umayyad dynasty
10th-century establishments in Al-Andalus
1031 disestablishments in Europe
11th-century disestablishments in Al-Andalus
Former Muslim countries in Europe
Former Arab states
Caliphate of Cordoba
Gharb Al-Andalus
States and territories established in the 920s
States and territories disestablished in 1031